Caerfai Bay is a rocky cove on the north coast of St Brides Bay near St Davids in Pembrokeshire, West Wales.  It is enclosed by steep varicoloured cliffs and has a sandy beach at low tide accessed by pathway and steps. The beach is situated in the Pembrokeshire Coast National Park and on the Pembrokeshire Coast Path. There is free parking above the beach with picnic benches and views of the islands of Penpleidiau, Skomer and Skokholm.

Location

Caerfai beach is only  from centre of the cathedral city of St Davids. Along the coast to the west is the Chapel of St Non which is the most westerly in Wales. On the eastern headland are ramparts of the Iron Age fort of Castell Penpleidiau and Caer Bwdy is next bay to the east.

Commercial activity
Caerfai Bay Caravan and Tent Park which started in the 1930s is open between March and November and has static hire, touring and camping pitches which overlook Caerfai Bay. Caerfai Farm is  producing organic milk, cheeses and potatoes using sustainable energy sources, including solar, geothermal, wind and biomass energy. The farm also has a seasonal shop and a campsite.

Geology
Both western and eastern cliff sections display distinctive red, purple and greenish mudstone, siltstone and sandstone formations representing parts of the Caerfai and Porth-y-rhaw geological Groups of Lower to Middle Cambrian age. The southern tip of the eastern Penpleidiau headland and its small islets are composed of dolerite, an Intrusive igneous rock. The intrusion is in sharp sill-like contact with baked fossiliferous Middle Cambrian (Drumian) mudstones from within the lower part of the Menevia Formation. Trilobite fossils found within the Menevia Formation at Penpleudiau include Ptychagnostus (s. l.) barrandei (Hicks), Condylopyge cf. rex (Barrande), Peronopsis scutalis cf. exarata (Grönwall), Tomagnostus brantevikensis Weidner and Nielsen, T.  cf. perrugatus (Grönwall), Mawddachites hicksii (Salter), Paradoxides (s. l.) illingi lake,  Parasolenopleura? elegans (Illing), and Holocephalites incerta (Illing), which enable correlation with Illing's (1916) Paradoxides hicksii fauna in the Abbey Shale Formation of Nuneaton, Warwickshire, England  and with the Tomagnostus fissus Biozone of Scandinavian biostratigraphic terminology (Rees et al., op. cit.).  There are disused quarries below the car park and at Caer Bwdy Bay which provided the purple sandstone used in the original construction of St Davids Cathedral and for its more recent stonework renovation during the 1980's.
Distinctive purple-coloured sandstone of the Caer Bwdy Bay Formation (Rees et al., op cit. p. 53) was also used in the construction of the stepped mount supporting the medieval stone cross in the centre of St David’s at Cross Square [Grid reference ].

See also
 Caerfai Group

References

External links
 Video panorama of Caerfai Bay
 Caerfai beach guide

Beaches of Pembrokeshire
Bays of Pembrokeshire